Randal Earl "Rink" Bond (November 14, 1914 – April 1982) was an American football player in the National Football League for the Washington Redskins and the Pittsburgh Pirates.  He played college football at the University of Washington.

1914 births
1982 deaths
People from Fairland, Oklahoma
American football quarterbacks
American football offensive linemen
Washington Huskies football players
Washington Redskins players
Pittsburgh Pirates (football) players